Braden Gellenthien (born 26 April 1986 in Boston), is an athlete from the United States who competes in compound archery. He is a former world number one archer and has won individual gold medals at the FITA Archery World Cup, Indoor World Championships and Arizona Cup, and team gold medals at the World Archery Championships.

He won the 2021 Athlete of the Year award by World Archery Americas in the compound men category.

He competed at the 2022 World Games held in Birmingham, Alabama, United States.

He is married to Danish archer Tanja Jensen.

References

External links
 

1986 births
Living people
American male archers
World Archery Championships medalists
Archers at the 2019 Pan American Games
Pan American Games silver medalists for the United States
Pan American Games medalists in archery
Medalists at the 2019 Pan American Games
Competitors at the 2022 World Games
20th-century American people
21st-century American people